Echo is a 2011 album by the Japanese rock band Nothing's Carved in Stone released on June 8, 2011.

Track listing

References 

2011 albums
Nothing's Carved in Stone albums